Atatürk Museum may refer to:

Atatürk Museum, Şişli, in Istanbul, Turkey
Atatürk Museum (Adana)
Atatürk Museum (Thessaloniki)
Atatürk Museum, Mersin
Atatürk's House Museum (Antalya)